The selvage of a knitted fabric consists of the stitch(es) that end each row ("course") of knitting.  Also called selvedge, the term derives from "self-edge".  The selvage may be considered finished; it may also be used in seaming garments, or finished and reinforced using crochet or other techniques. There are many methods for producing selvages.

References
 June Hemmons Hiatt (2012) The Principles of Knitting, Simon & Schuster, pp. 72–75.

See also
 Selvage

Knitting methods for shaping